Blairlogie is a village in the Stirling council area of Scotland, situated at the base of the great southern rock-face of Dumyat between Stirling and Menstrie.

Blairlogie forms part of the parish of the ancient Logie Kirk which lies to its west. It comprises mainly 17th-19th century cottages and was one of central Scotland's earliest Conservation villages.

At the foot of Castle Law (and giving its name to the hill) stood Blairlogie Castle (also known as "The Blair"), built in 1543 by Alexander Spittal and surviving until the early 20th century. The castle and surrounding estate was purchased by Lt Col Hare of Calder Hall in 1891 who extensively rebuilt it.

An abandoned copper mine lies to the east of the village.

Between 1598 and 1609, the minister of Logie Kirk was the poet Alexander Hume.

The Scottish International rugby player Kenny Logan used to live in the village and several of his relatives live in the area.

References

External links

 Blairlogie Archive

Hillfoots Villages
Villages in Stirling (council area)